Donaldo Ernesto Reyes Avelar (born 18 June 1939 in Santa Bárbara) is a Honduran lawyer and politician. He currently serves as deputy of the National Congress of Honduras representing the National Party of Honduras for Santa Bárbara.

References

1939 births
Living people
People from Santa Bárbara Department, Honduras
20th-century Honduran lawyers
Deputies of the National Congress of Honduras
National Party of Honduras politicians